Thomas Freke (17 January 1660 – 1721), of Hannington, Wiltshire, was an English Whig politician who sat in the  English and British House of Commons between 1685 and 1710.

Freke was the eldest son of Thomas Freke of Hinton St. Mary, Dorset and his second wife Elizabeth Clarke, daughter of Sir William Clarke of Ford Place, Wrotham, Kent. He matriculated at Wadham College, Oxford on 19 March 1675, aged 15  and was also admitted at the Middle Temple in 1675.  He married Elizabeth Pile, the daughter and coheiress of Thomas Pile of Baverstock, Wiltshire on 10 October 1683.  He succeeded his great-uncle to Hannington Hall in 1684.

Freke was returned as Member of Parliament  for Cricklade in a double return at the 1685 English general election and was allowed to sit until  10 June 1685 when it was resolved against him. At the 1689 English general election he was defeated in the poll at Cricklade, but was seated on petition on 5 April 1689. He was returned as MP  for Weymouth and Melcombe Regis at a by election on  22 May 1691 and was returned again at the 1698 English general election. He declined to stand in 1701 for various reasons, including the disruption to his domestic life. Later, in 1701, his wife inherited the Shroton estates of another  Thomas Freke and he took up residence there. He was undecided where to stand for Parliament again until the 1705 English general election when he was returned unopposed as MP for  Lyme Regis. He voted for the Court candidate for Speaker on 25 October 1705. He was returned as a Whig for Lyme Regis in a contest at the 1708 British general election. He voted for the naturalization of the Palatines in 1709 and for the impeachment of Dr Sacheverell in 1710. He retired from Parliament at the 1710 British general election.
 
Freke's wife, Elizabeth,  died in 1714, and he married as his second wife, in December 1718, Mary Corbett. He died without issue in 1721 and the Hannington estate passed to his brother William, the Socinian author.

References

1660 births
1721 deaths
Alumni of Wadham College, Oxford
Members of the Middle Temple
English MPs 1685–1687
English MPs 1689–1690
English MPs 1690–1695
English MPs 1695–1698
English MPs 1698–1700
English MPs 1705–1707
British MPs 1707–1708
Members of the Parliament of England (pre-1707) for Cricklade